Highway 786 is a provincial highway in the Canadian province of Saskatchewan. It runs from Highway 12 to Highway 40 near Marcelin. Highway 786 is about 14 km (9 mi.) long.

See also 
Roads in Saskatchewan
Transportation in Saskatchewan

References 

786